Sagittarius Dwarf Galaxy may refer to:

 The Sagittarius Dwarf Spheroidal Galaxy (also known as the Sagittarius Dwarf Elliptical Galaxy), a satellite galaxy of the Milky Way
 The Sagittarius Dwarf Irregular Galaxy, a small member of the Local Group